Shane Morigeau (born September 8, 1984) is an American politician. He grew up in Ronan, Montana, and he is a member of the Confederated Salish and Kootenai Tribes of the Flathead Nation.

Early life and education 
He graduated from the Alexander Blewett III School of Law at the University of Montana and the James E. Rogers College of Law at the University of Arizona. He served as a Democratic member of the Montana House of Representatives for District 95 from 2017 until 2021. In 2020, Morigeau won the Democratic party nomination for state auditor, but was defeated in the general election by Republican Troy Downing.

Less than a week after the 2020 general election, incumbent state senator Nate McConnell resigned. McConnell endorsed Morigeau as his successor. Subsequently, Morigeau was formally appointed by the Missoula County Board of Commissioners to serve in the Montana Senate.

References

1984 births
21st-century American politicians
James E. Rogers College of Law alumni
Living people
Democratic Party members of the Montana House of Representatives
Democratic Party Montana state senators
Native American state legislators in Montana
People from Ronan, Montana
University of Montana alumni